Hajjiabad-e Amlak (also Romanized as Ḩājjīābād-e Āmlāḵ; also known as Ḩājjīābād and Ḩājīābād) is a village in Ferunabad Rural District, in the Central District of Pakdasht County, Tehran Province, Iran. At the 2006 census, its population was 686, in 173 families.

References 

Populated places in Pakdasht County